Stenocorus vittiger is a species of beetle in the family Cerambycidae. Similar to Analeptura lineola, this species has a brown coloured pronotum with 4 black stripes.

References

Lepturinae